Laro Gabriel Setién Lozano (born 8 April 1995) is a Spanish footballer who plays for SD Formentera as a midfielder.

Club career
Born in Santander, Cantabria, Laro was a youth product of CD Lugo. He made his official debut for the Galicians' main squad on 16 October 2013, while still a junior, replacing Víctor Marco in a 0–1 away loss against Recreativo de Huelva for the season's Copa del Rey.

On 6 August 2014 Laro went on a trial at Burgos CF. However, nothing came of it and he moved to Racing de Santander late in the month, being assigned to the reserves in Tercera División.

Laro scored his first goal for Racing B on 29 August 2014, netting the third of a 4–0 away routing over CD Bezana. In September 2016, he was promoted to the first team in Segunda División B.

On 30 December 2016, Laro moved to fellow league team Racing de Ferrol after cutting ties with the Verdiblancos. The following 27 May, he joined Córdoba CF B still in the third division.

Setién spent the next few years in the fourth tier, with UM Escobedo, UE Sant Andreu and SD Formentera.

Personal life
Laro's father, Quique Setién, was also a footballer and a midfielder, and later a manager of clubs including FC Barcelona. His grandfather José Antonio Lozano was also a footballer, and all of them represented Racing.

References

External links

1995 births
Living people
Spanish footballers
Footballers from Santander, Spain
Association football midfielders
Segunda División B players
Tercera División players
CD Lugo players
Rayo Cantabria players
Racing de Santander players
Racing de Ferrol footballers
Córdoba CF B players
UE Sant Andreu footballers
SD Formentera players